Armas Herman Saastamoinen (14 April 1886 Kuopio – 20 October 1932 London) was Finnish businessman, MP and Finnish Envoy to Copenhagen, The Hague, Washington and London.

A. H. Saastamoinen was the eldest son of commercial Counselor Herman Saastamoinen and Alexandra Sofia Tengman . His spouse since 1909 was Edla Emilia (Emily) Caress.

Saastamoinen participated in the activities of the Jaeger movement in North Savo. He also visited the  Lockstedt Jaeger camp in Hohenlockstedt

Saastamo was the head of the Savo District Civil Guard  in 1917 and secretary of the Northern Savo and Kainuu military district during the Finnish Civil War in 1918. After the war, he became Finland's first Envoy to Copenhagen (1918-1919) and then to Washington (1919-1921). He returned to Finland for the post of Envoy  to work in his family business H. Saastamoinen Ltd, H. Saastamoinen & pojat Oy and Saastamonen Oy 1921. In this position, he continued until 1926 when he focused on social tasks. He was a Member of the Parliament in 1924-1926 from the National Coalition Party. Saastamoinen was appointed Finland's Envoy to London and The Hague in 1926. He was serving these duties until his death. Saastamoinen died in London in 1932.

References 

1886 births
1932 deaths
People from Kuopio
People from Kuopio Province (Grand Duchy of Finland)
National Coalition Party politicians
Members of the Parliament of Finland (1924–27)
20th-century Finnish businesspeople
Finnish diplomats
People of the Finnish Civil War (White side)